Vocal War: God's Voice is a 2016 South Korean television show. It aired on SBS from March 30 to August 15, 2016. The show involves amateur singers who wish to challenge a legendary singer of South Korea, "God's voice", and will have the opportunity to do so when the audience gives them 100 votes to go on to the next round. The show first started as a New Year's special, acting as a pilot for the show which aired on February 10, 2016.

Hosts
 Lee Hwi-jae (–)
 Sung Si-kyung (–)

Legendary singers

Format

Round 1

Stage 1
The contestant sings their chosen song, but without their appearance being shown to the audience. From an audience of 200, the contestant has to earn at least 100 votes from them in order to reach stage 2, otherwise they will be eliminated.

Stage 2
The contestant's appearance is now revealed. With the remaining length of the contestant's song, they need to obtain at least three votes from the legendary singers to move onto round 2, otherwise they will be eliminated.

Round 2
The contestant is given the chance to choose one of the legendary singers that they want to compete against. The contestant also picks a song, from a choice of four, for the legendary singer to sing. The legendary singer has three hours to prepare for the chosen song. 
After both the contestant and legendary singer performs, the audience votes on who they liked the best and whoever earns the highest number of votes is the winner.

Prizes
Depending on how many wins the contestant has, they will win a certain amount of money.

Episode list

See also
Fantastic Duo
Duet Song Festival

References

External links
 Official website 

2016 South Korean television series debuts
2016 South Korean television series endings
Korean-language television shows
South Korean music television shows
Seoul Broadcasting System original programming